Grčarevec (in older sources also Gerčarevec) is a village between Planina and Kalce in the Municipality of Logatec in the Inner Carniola region of Slovenia. In addition to the main settlement of the village, it also comprises the hamlets of Grčarevski Vrh to the north along the road to Kalce, and Kališe in the forest to the northeast.

Geography
The region around the village contains many springs, the water of which disappears into nearby sinkholes. The surrounding spruce forest is economically important and in the past compensated for the poor soil, which was mainly farmed for  corn and potatoes for local use. South of the main settlement is Hotenjke Springs, which contributes to flooding of Planina Karst Field. The remains of several woolly rhinoceros were discovered in Dolar Cave in 1933.

Name
It has been suggested that the name Grčarevec may derived from *Gričar 'hill dweller', based on the Slovene common noun grič 'hill'. The settlement was known as Gartschareuz in German.

Church
The local church in the settlement is dedicated to Saint Luke and belongs to the Parish of Planina. The church was built in 1746.

References

External links 
Grčarevec on Geopedia

Populated places in the Municipality of Logatec